John Michael Meek (July 18, 1955 – August 29, 2007) better known by his ring name Iron Mike Steele was a professional wrestler and also made frequent appearances on Pro Wrestling Weekly. He was a student of Boris Malenko and Tor Kamata.  A Florida native, according to Online World of Wrestling, Steele took part in several matchups with notable names in the 90s including Marc Mero and Dean Malenko. A motorcycle crash would effectively end his wrestling career in 1994. Meek was killed in a traffic homicide on August 29, 2007. Steele refused to fight a belligerent, drunk man at a bar. Steele walked out of the bar and left on his Harley Davidson motorcycle. The man followed behind him in his work van and rammed Steele's Harley Davidson. The killer was charged with murder and sentenced to life without parole. The Iron Mike Foundation was started in his name to raise money for children's charity.

References 

1955 births
2007 deaths
American male professional wrestlers
People murdered in Florida
Male murder victims
Professional wrestlers from Florida